Pilsotas is a 34-story building in the Gandrališkės residential district of Klaipėda, Lithuania designed by Donatas Rakauskas, completed in May 2007. It is the tallest residential building in Lithuania. The tower is named after a medieval Curonian land, *Pilsāts, encompassing the area in which it is located.

Statistics
Construction of the tower started in June 2005 and finished in 2007.

See also
Vilnius TV Tower
Tallest buildings in Lithuania

Buildings and structures in Klaipėda
Skyscrapers in Lithuania
Buildings and structures completed in 2007
Residential skyscrapers